Kamiane is a village in the Sumy Raion of Sumy Oblast (province), Ukraine.

Kamyane is a very old village with rich history, located on the right bank of Psel River, in the North-Eastern Ukraine.

In January 2010 a wooden church built in 1870 burned down in the village.

References

Villages in Sumy Raion